James Shudi Broadwood (20 December 1772 – 8 August 1851) was a piano maker in Middlesex and a magistrate in Surrey.

His  son, Henry Fowler Broadwood (1811–1893), took control of the family piano-manufacturing business in 1836. He was also the father of the folk song collector John Broadwood (1798–1864).

References 
Citations

Bibliography

External links 
 John Broadwood and Sons, official website
  John Broadwood and Sons Piano Manufacturers by Sally Jenkinson, Surrey County Council
Broadwood in the grand piano-Photoarchive

1772 births
1851 deaths
English musical instrument makers
High Sheriffs of Surrey
Piano makers
People from Crawley
People from Warnham